Eudonia petrophila is a species of moth in the family Crambidae. It is found in Spain, France, Italy, Switzerland, Austria, Germany, Poland, the Czech Republic, Slovakia, Bosnia and Herzegovina, Serbia and Montenegro, Romania, Albania and the Republic of Macedonia.

References

Moths described in 1848
Eudonia
Moths of Europe